Robilante is a comune (municipality) in the Province of Cuneo in the Italian region Piedmont, located about  south of Turin and about  southwest of Cuneo.

The municipality of Robilante contains the frazioni (subdivisions, mainly villages and hamlets) Tetto Pettavino, Malandre, Montasso and Tetto Chiappello.

Robilante borders the following municipalities: Boves, Roaschia, Roccavione, and Vernante.

Demographic evolution

References

Cities and towns in Piedmont